Kurttepe is a mahalle  in the Çukurova district of the city of Adana. The neighborhood is located at north end of the city, at the shores of Seyhan Lake.

Governance
Kurttepe is a mahalle and it is administered by the Muhtar and the Seniors Council.

Demographics
The population of Kurttepe as of December 31, 2014 is 5916.

Economy
Kurttepe is former village which annexed to the city as a mahalle, after the expansion of the city to the north. Major institution in the neighborhood is the Tüyap Exhibition Hall and the Seyhan Research Hospital.

Transport
Adana Metro Anadolu Lisesi station (alternatively known as Kurttepe station) is one kilometer south of the mahalle.

Adana Metropolitan Municipality Bus Department (ABBO) has bus routes from downtown Adana to the Seyhan Research Hospital within the Kurttepe neighborhood. Bus #159 is a 35-minute interval service that connects Kurttepe to the Central railway station, old town and to the Şakirpaşa Airport .

References

Neighborhoods/Settlements in Adana